Walter Trout (born March 6, 1951 in Ocean City, New Jersey, United States) is an American blues guitarist, singer and songwriter.

Biography
Trout's career began on the Jersey coast scene of the late 1960s and early 1970s. He then decided to relocate to Los Angeles where he became a sideman for John Lee Hooker, Percy Mayfield, Big Mama Thornton, Joe Tex, and many others.

Between 1981 and 1984, he was the lead guitarist in Canned Heat. He toured with them extensively in the US, Europe, and Australia. From 1984 to 1989, he was the lead guitarist in John Mayall's Bluesbreakers following in the footsteps of guitarists such as  Peter Green and Eric Clapton. Trout recorded and toured with the Bluesbreakers worldwide. The many successes on stage were accompanied by a self-destructive lifestyle offstage. Trout recalled in a 2018 interview with Blues Radio International that while playing with John Mayall, he was rescued from a complete descent into alcohol and substance abuse by a post-gig encounter with Carlos Santana.

Trout left the Bluesbreakers in 1989 and formed the 'Walter Trout Band' which developed a successful following in Europe, especially Scandinavia where he found himself playing to large festival crowds such as at the Midtfyns Festival and Skanderborg Festival. The Times named Trout's first solo album, Life in the Jungle, "the greatest album in the history of the blues-rock genre." Between 1990 and 1992, Trout's first two albums sold over 100,000 copies.

In 1991, his song, "The Love That We Once Knew" climbed the charts in the Netherlands leading to a Top 10 radio hit. Performances at Park Pop and Pink Pop solidified his status there. When home between tours and until 2005, Trout hosted all-night jams with his celebrity friends in Huntington Beach. Such jams featured Richie Hayward (Little Feat), Jesse Ed Davis, Mick Taylor, John Mayall, Garth Hudson, Billy Gibbons, TM Stevens, Teena Marie, and many more.

In 1994, the official Walter Trout Fan Club for the Netherlands and Belgium was founded, followed in 1996 by the official International Fan Club which had members in 14 countries in Europe, America, Asia and Australia.

In 1998, Trout released his self-titled US debut album and renamed his band 'Walter Trout and the Free Radicals' (later renamed 'Walter Trout and the Radicals' and currently simply 'Walter Trout'). Since, Trout has been recording prolifically and touring in North and Central America, Europe, Australia, and India.

In 2002, he was featured on the Bo Diddley tribute album, Hey Bo Diddley – A Tribute!, performing the song "Road Runner" and many more guest appearances on other recordings.

In June 2013, while touring Germany, Trout got the first signs that he was suffering from cirrhosis of the liver. With his health deteriorating, he continued to tour until told he needed a liver transplant within 90 days. Supported by donations from fans, his wife raised the money needed for them to move out of state for lengthy stays in order to qualify for transplantation in various states. Trout recovered from his cirrhosis and subsequent liver transplant in a hospital bed for eight months, during which time he suffered from brain damage, which caused him to lose the ability to speak, play the guitar, and recognize his family.  Due to being bedridden, he also lost the use of his legs during this time. He had to relearn how to speak and walk. Trout has also stated that he spent eight hours a day over the course of a year to relearn how to play the guitar. On May 26, 2014, Trout received the lifesaving operation. By 2015, Trout had recovered and was able to go on tour in Europe. His 2015 album, Battle Scars, chronicled his battle with liver failure and the excruciating wait for a donated liver to become available.

Also in 2014, a documentary hosted by Dutch rock journalist TJ Lammers about Trout's life was released to coincide with Trout's album, When the Blues Came Calling. At the same time, a
biography, Rescued From Reality, co-written by British music journalist, Henry Yates, was
released.

In 2015, Trout had recovered and returned to performing at the Royal Albert Hall in London. He was introduced onstage by his wife.

In November 2015, Trout became a patron of The British Liver Trust to help raise awareness and much-needed funding for the cause. Trout, and his wife, Marie have helped raise awareness for Donate Life Nebraska and are also patrons of the Danish Liver Foundation, as well as Organdonation – Ja Tak. "I'm only still here because someone donated their liver" he said.

In 2019, Trout's album, Survivor Blues, debuted with two consecutive weeks on the Billboard Blues Chart at number one and stayed in the top ten for twelve weeks. Metal Zone magazine, reviewed his performance in London by naming Trout "the ultimate, supreme bluesman of the 20th and 21st centuries."

In April 2022, Trout announced his latest studio album Ride, alongside the lead single "Ghosts." Describing the title, Trout said, "... life is kind of a ride too, isn’t it? And I want to live mine to the fullest.” The album was released on 19 August 2022.

Awards
Blues Music Awards
 2016 Song of the Year for Gonna Live Again
 2016 Rock Blues Album of the Year for Battle Scars (re-released in US in 2002)
 2018  Rock Blues Album of the Year for We’re All In This Together.
 2021 Song of the Year for All Out of Tears co-written with Teeny Tucker and Marie Trout

SENA European Guitar Awards
 Winner of the SENA European Guitar Award 2015

British Blues Awards
 2013  Overseas Artist of the Year
 2014  Overseas Artist of the Year
 2015  Overseas Artist of the Year

Blues Blast Music Awards
 2016  Blues Rock Album.
 2017  Live Blues Album.
 2018  Blues Rock Album and Male Blues Artist of the Year.

Polls
Planet Rock: Greatest Blues Artists of All Time: #5
Arrow Classic Rock: #1 Best Blues Song in 2012, 2013, 2015, and 2016.
BBC Listener's Poll: #5 (tied with Brian May) Best Guitarist 1993

TV shows

VH1 Europe: Under the Bridge
German National TV: Ohne Filter
PBS Special
Denmark: DR and TV2

Private life
In 1990, Trout met a 27-year-old advertising executive, Marie Brændgård during the recording of his second solo album, Prisoner of a Dream, in Denmark. Although married at the time, he pursued her, and convinced her to leave Denmark and move to California. Trout filed for divorce. In 1991, they were married in Huntington Beach, California, where the couple still live with their three sons. They also maintain a residence in Denmark. Marie has managed Trout's career since 1993 and gained a PhD in Wisdom Studies in 2015. In February of 2017, her book The Blues-Why It Still Hurts So Good was released. Trout and Marie have co-written several songs together, and in 2021 their collaboration on the song All Out of Tears, a three-way co-write with Teeny Tucker, won the "Song of the Year" Award at the Blues Awards in Memphis.

Discography
Walter Trout Band
 1989  Life in the Jungle (re-released in US in 2002)
 1990  Prisoner of a Dream
 1992  Transition
 1992  No More Fish Jokes (live album)
 1994  Tellin' Stories
 1995  Breaking The Rules
 1996  Jimi Hendrix Music Festival (Janblues)
 1997  Positively Beale St.Walter Trout and the Free Radicals 
 1998  Walter Trout (same tracks as Positively Beale St.)
 1999  Livin' Every Day 2000  Face The Music (Live on Tour) 2000  Live Trout 2001  Go The DistanceJohn Mayall's Bluesbreakers featuring Walter Trout
 1985  Behind the Iron Curtain (live in Hungary), reissue:
 2004  Steppin' Out 1987  Chicago Line, reissues:
 1994  Uncle John's Nickel Guitar 1999  Blues Power (with bonus CD Life in the Jungle: Charly Blues Masterworks Vol. 4)
 2000  Blues Breaker (with 2 bonus tracks)
 1988  The Power of the Blues (live in Germany 1987), reissues:
 1993  New Bluesbreakers: The Blues Collection Vol. 8 2003  Blues Forever (with bonus CD Life in the Jungle: Charly Blues Masterworks Vol. 4)
 1993  Life in the Jungle: Charly Blues Masterworks Vol. 4 2005  Rolling with the Blues (live 1972–1973, 1980 and 1982), reissue:
 2006  The Private CollectionWalter Trout and the Radicals 
 2001  Go The Distance 2003  Relentless 2005  Deep Trout: The Early Years of Walter Trout 2006  Full Circle (featuring guest artists)
 2007  Hardcore (self released recording of the 'Power Trio' playing live in Europe)

Walter Trout
 2008  The Outsider 2009  Unspoiled By Progress: 20 Years of Hardcore Blues (previously unreleased tracks and three new songs)
 2010  Common Ground 2012  Blues For The Modern Daze 2013  Luther's Blues 2014  The Blues Came Callin 2015  Battle Scars 2016  Alive In Amsterdam 2017  We're All In This Together 2019  Survivor Blues 2020  Ordinary Madness 2022  Ride''

References

External links
 Official website of Walter Trout and Official Global Fan Club
2006 Walter Trout interview by Brian D. Holland

1951 births
Living people
American blues guitarists
American male guitarists
American blues singers
Blues rock musicians
Electric blues musicians
Canned Heat members
John Mayall & the Bluesbreakers members
Singers from New Jersey
People from Ocean City, New Jersey
Guitarists from New Jersey
20th-century American guitarists
Ruf Records artists
Provogue Records artists